Molodizhne is a village (selo) of Ukraine, in Volnovakha Raion of Donetsk Oblast. Since August 2014, it has been occupied by separatist forces of the Donetsk People's Republic.

Demographics 
According to the 2001 census, the village had a population of 157. Of these, 68.15% declared their native language to be Ukrainian and 29.3% Russian.

References 

Rural settlements in Donetsk Oblast
Webarchive template wayback links